Narkatiya/Chauradano(Assembly constituency Chauradano) is an assembly constituency in Purvi Champaran district in the Indian state of Bihar.

Overview
As per orders of Delimitation of Parliamentary and Assembly constituencies Order, 2008, 12. Narkatiya Assembly constituency is composed of the following: Banjaria, Chhauradano (Narkatia) and Bankatwa community development blocks.

Narkatiya Assembly constituency is part of 2. Paschim Champaran (Lok Sabha constituency).

Members of Legislative Assembly

Election results

2020

2015

2010

References

External links
 

Assembly constituencies of Bihar
Politics of East Champaran district